Tariq Amin is a Pakistani hairdresser, celebrity wardrobe stylist, hair stylist and media personality. He has salons in Islamabad, Lahore and Karachi.

Amin graduated with a business degree from the College of Boca Raton, Florida in 1983. His work has also been shown in Vogue Magazine. He has done the makeup for music videos by Ali Azmat and Abbas Ali Khan among others, as well as appeared in the video for "Channo" by Ali Zafar. Amin has also featured in Adil Omar's "Paki Rambo" music video.

In 2011, Amin was in charge of heading Islamabad's first fashion week as well as launching 'T With T, his own reality show.

References

Living people
Pakistani hairdressers
People from Islamabad
Lynn University alumni
Year of birth missing (living people)